Ketonggo Stadium is a football stadium in the town of Ngawi, Indonesia. The stadium has a capacity of 10,000 people.

It is the home base of Persinga Ngawi.

References

Sports venues in Indonesia
Football venues in Indonesia
Multi-purpose stadiums in Indonesia